Elephant Stampede is a 1951 American adventure film directed by Ford Beebe and starring Johnny Sheffield, Donna Martell and Edith Evanson. It was the sixth in the 12-film Bomba, the Jungle Boy series. The film's sets were designed by the art director, Vin Taylor.

A new Commissioner Barnes shows up and he appears in all of the adventures which follow.

Plot
A school teacher has the locals learning to read. Her beautiful assistant is teaching Bomba, when two ivory poachers arrive in the village and try to force Bomba to lead them to a hidden cache of ivory. Bomba calls on his elephant friends to deal out the fitting finish.

Cast
 Johnny Sheffield as Bomba
 Donna Martell as Lola
 John Kellogg as Bob Warren
 Edith Evanson as Miss Banks
 Martin Wilkins as Chief Nagalia
 Myron Healey as Joe Collins
 Leonard Mudie as Andy Barnes
 Guy Kingsford as Mark Phillips

Production
The film was shot in Arcadia, California, in the botanical garden now known as the Los Angeles County Arboretum and Botanic Garden.

References

External links
 
 
 
 

1951 films
American adventure films
Films directed by Ford Beebe
Films produced by Walter Mirisch
Monogram Pictures films
1951 adventure films
American black-and-white films
1950s English-language films
1950s American films